GE Research is the research and development division of General Electric.  GE Global Research locations include:
 Global Research Center in Niskayuna, New York, established as the General Electric Research Laboratory in Schenectady in 1900 and relocated to Niskayuna in 1955.
This site is also known as the Knolls Laboratory, to distinguish it from the original Schenectady location. It is adjacent to the Knolls Atomic Power Laboratory.
 John F. Welch Technology Centre in Bangalore, India, established in 2000.

Notable employees
Researchers at GE Global Research include:

Ralph Alpher, cosmologist
William David Coolidge, physicist
Ivar Giaever, Nobel Laureate, physicist
Juris Hartmanis, Turing Award winner, computer scientist
Christopher J. Hardy, industrial physicist
Irving Langmuir, Nobel Laureate, chemist and physicist
 James L. Lawson, physicist
David Musser, computer scientist
James Rumbaugh, computer scientist
Charles Proteus Steinmetz, mathematician and electrical engineer
Alexander Stepanov, computer scientist
Richard Stearns, Turing Award winner, computer scientist
Willis Rodney Whitney, chemist
Carl Woese, biophysicist

Former locations
GE Global Research operations at all locations other than Niskayuna and Bangalore were discontinued in 2017 as part of a cost-cutting program of General Electric:
 Shanghai, China, 2000–2017, now GE's China Technology Center operated by business units.
 Munich, Germany, 2003–2017, now GE's European Technology Center operated by business units and also home of GE Additive's Customer Experience Center.
 Rio de Janeiro, Brazil, 2014–2017, now GE's Brazil Technology Center operated by business units.
 Oil and Gas Technology Center, Oklahoma City, Oklahoma, 2014–2017, only GE research center to focus on one industry, now part of Baker Hughes.
 Saudi Technology and Innovation Center in Dhahran, Saudi Arabia, established in 2013, focuses on Material Characterization, Combustion & Fuels, and Data Analytics.
 Advanced Manufacturing and Software Technology Center in Van Buren, Michigan, established in 2011, focuses on Advanced Manufacturing, Software, and IT.
 Israel Technology Center in Tirat Carmel, Israel, established in 2011, focuses on Healthcare, Energy, Software Analytics, Cyber Security, and Advanced Manufacturing.

References

External links
 Official website

Organizations with year of establishment missing
Research and development organizations
Organizations based in New York (state)
General Electric subsidiaries
Buildings and structures in Schenectady County, New York